ZAMNET Communication Systems Ltd., established in 1994, is primarily a Zambian Internet service provider.

Zamnet was also the domain name registry for the .zm country code top-level domain until that function was delegated to ZICTA in 2014. It now provides only the services of a registrar.

References

Telecommunications companies of Zambia
Telecommunications companies established in 1994
1994 establishments in Zambia
Companies based in Lusaka